Shane O'Mara is a neuroscientist who currently is Professor of Experimental Brain Research at Trinity College Dublin. He is a member of the Royal Irish Academy.

Works

References

Academics of Trinity College Dublin
Members of the Royal Irish Academy
Irish neuroscientists
Year of birth missing (living people)
Living people